Paul Joseph Phạm Đình Tụng (15 June 1919 – 22 February 2009) was a Vietnamese cardinal.

Ecclesiastical career
He was ordained to the priesthood on 6 June 1949. He was pastor of Hàm Long Parish, in Hanoi, North Vietnam, from 1950 to 1955. Afterwards he served as Superior of St. John Minor Seminary, in Hanoi, from 1955 to 1963. The Seminary was closed by the State authority in 1960 and never opened again. He was created bishop of Bac Ninh in 1963. He was appointed archbishop of Hanoi in 13 April 1994 and elevated to Cardinal in November 1994. He retired as archbishop of Hanoi in 2005 and was succeeded by Archbishop Joseph Ngô Quang Kiêt.

Since nearly the very beginning of his religious life, he was under house arrest, unable to carry out his duties to the nearly 100 parishes under his jurisdiction.

He began to compile in lục bát the entire life of Jesus, the Gospels, Christian doctrine, and the commandments of God and the Church. He was created a Cardinal-Priest of Santa Maria Regina Pacis in Ostia Mare by John Paul II during the Consistory of 26 November 1994. He resigned the pastoral government of the archdiocese on 19 February 2005. He died on 22 February 2009 at the age of 89. He was succeeded by Joseph Ngô Quang Kiệt.

References

External links
 catholic-hierarchy page of Paul Joseph Pham Dinh Tung
 Cardinal Paul Joseph Pham Đình Tung, Archbishop emeritus of Hà Nội (Viêt Nam) passed away

1919 births
2009 deaths
People from Hòa Bình Province
Vietnamese cardinals
Cardinals created by Pope John Paul II
20th-century Roman Catholic archbishops in Vietnam
Vietnamese Roman Catholic archbishops